Agnieszka Urszula Dygant (born 27 March 1973) is a Polish actress. She is a two-time Telekamery Award winner for Best Actress.

Biography 
She studied at the LVI Liceum Ogólnokształcące named after Leon Kruczkowski in Warsaw. In her teenage years, she sang in the punk band Dekolt.

On November 23, 1997, she made her theater debut. In 1998, she graduated from Łódź Film School and received the Łódź Voivode's award for the role of Julia in the play Letnica at the 16th Theater School Festival in Łódź, and won second prize at the 19th Stage Song Review in Wrocław, performing Agnieszka Osiecka's song "Sing-Sing" with Maciej Pawłowski's band.

In 2000, she starred in the music video of the band Myslovitz, awarded with Fryderyk, "For You". In 2007, she became the second Polish star to advertise L'Oréal's Garnier brand products.

She won nine Telekamery nominations in the actress category, winning twice (2006, 2008) and taking second place four times (2005, 2007, 2009, 2015).

In 2007, she received the Star of Smile at the VIII Festival of Good Humor in Gdańsk and two Golden Horseshoes at the Cieszyn Festival "Wakacyjne Kadry" for the best female role in a comedy series (Niania) and the best female role in a sensational series (Fala zbrodni).

She was the wife of Marcin Władyniak. Then she became married with the director and screenwriter Patrick Yoka, with whom she has a son, Xawery (born 2010).

Selected filmography

References

External links
 

1973 births
Living people
People from Piaseczno
Polish film actresses
Polish television actresses
Polish stage actresses
Łódź Film School alumni